Cool Night is the seventh and final studio album by singer/songwriter Paul Davis. It was his highest-charting album in the United States, reaching #52 on the Billboard album chart, and yielded three top-40 singles, "Cool Night", "'65 Love Affair", and "Love or Let Me Be Lonely". The third was a remake of a song by The Friends of Distinction. This album was the first to be both recorded and mixed fully digitally. It features backing vocals by the Commodores who were simultaneously recording their 1981 album In the Pocket.

Track listing 
All tracks were written by Paul Davis except where noted.

 "Cool Night" – 3:40
 "You Came to Me" (Davis, Joe Wilson, Mike Hughes) – 3:38
 "One More Time for the Lonely" – 4:09
 "Nathan Jones" (Leonard Caston Jr., Kathy Wakefield) – 3:27
 "Oriental Eyes" – 4:28
 "'65 Love Affair" – 3:54
 "Somebody's Gettin' to You" – 3:30 
 "Love or Let Me Be Lonely" (Skip Scarborough, Jerry Peters, Anita Poree) – 3:41 
 "What You Got to Say About Love" (Davis, Doug Bare, Ben Rappa) – 3:53 
 "We're Still Together" – 3:40

Personnel 
 Paul Davis – lead and backing vocals, keyboards 
 Doug Bare – keyboards 
 Tommy Cooper – keyboards
 Ed Seay – keyboards, bass, backing vocals
 Vance Taylor – keyboards
 Steve Hardwick – guitars 
 Rick Hinkle – guitars 
 Barry Dunaway – bass
 Steve Tischer – bass
 Gene Chrisman – drums 
 Jean T. McHine – drums 
 Benny Rappa – drums, backing vocals 
 Carol Veto – backing vocals

Production 
 Paul Davis – producer 
 Ed Seay – producer, engineer 
 Tommy Cooper – engineer 
 Jim Loyd – mastering 
 Masterfonics (Nashville, Tennessee) – mastering location 
 Donn Davenport – art direction 
 Neal Pozner – design 
 Tom Biondo – photography

Notes 

1981 albums
Paul Davis (singer) albums
Arista Records albums